This is a list of main law schools in Russia in alphabetical order.

Russian law schools do not require attendees to have a bachelor's degree. For example, Vladimir Putin attended law school straight out of high school.

In Russia, the higher education is considered to be a higher education if only it was acquired at state or private institutions of higher education which had the state accreditation for particular speciality at the time of graduation. In addition, there is non-state professional-social accreditation of quality of directly legal education provided for in Decree of President of Russia of 26 May 2009, №599, which is carried out by Association of Lawyers of Russia. However, as of 2020, the Association of Lawyers of Russia assessed only a small number of russian law schools. Also, there are many rankings done by private agencies.

 Academic Law University under the auspices of the Institute of State and Law, Russian Academy of Sciences
 Bashkir State University - Institute of Law
 Baikal State University of Economics and Law
 Chelyabinsk State University - Faculty of Law
 Finance University under the Government of the Russian Federation - Faculty of Law
 Higher School of Economics - Faculty of Law
 Institute of Legislation and Comparative Law
 Irkutsk State University - Faculty of Law
 Kazan Federal University - Faculty of Law
 Khabarovsk State Academy of Economics and Law
 Kutafin Moscow State Law University
 Moscow State Institute of International Relations - International Law School
 Moscow State University, Faculty of Law
 Novosibirsk State University - Institute for the Philosophy and Law
 Petrozavodsk State University - Faculty of Law
 Russian Peoples' Friendship University - Faculty of Law
 Russian Presidential Academy of National Economy and Public Administration – Institute of Law and National Security
 Russian State University for the Humanities - Faculty of Law
 Russian School of Private Law
 Ryazan State University - Faculty of Law
 Saint Petersburg State Polytechnical University - Faculty of Law
 Saint Petersburg State University, Faculty of Law
 Saratov State Academy of Law
 Siberian Federal University - Institute of Law
 State University of Management - Institute of Public Administration and Law
 South Ural State University - Faculty of Law
 Tomsk State University - Institute of Law
 Tyumen State University - Faculty of Law
 Ural State Law University
 Voronezh State University - Faculty of Law

See also
Bachelor of Laws

References

Russia
Law schools